Music of the Peloponnese is the music of the geographic and historical region of Peloponnese.
Folk dances from Peloponnese, include the basic form of syrtos music and its alternative kinds.
The most common dances of Peloponnese are:

Kalamatianos
Kalamatiano
Caryatid's
monodiplos
Ai Georgis
diplos Horos
Tsakonikos
Tsamikos

See also
Music of Greece
Greek dances
Greek folk music

Greek music
Peloponnese